Football in America could mean:

United States

 American football
 American football in the United States
 National Football League
 Association football
 Soccer in the United States
 Major League Soccer

The Americas

 Association football 
 CONCACAF
 CONCACAF Gold Cup
 CONCACAF Champions League
 CONMEBOL
 Copa América
 Copa Libertadores
 Soccer in Canada
 Canadian football
 Canadian Football League

See also
American (word)
American football (disambiguation)
Association football in America (disambiguation)
Football in the United States (disambiguation)
Football (word)
Sports in the United States
Sport in South America